Elytroleptus is a genus of beetles in the family Cerambycidae, containing the following species:

 Elytroleptus apicalis (LeConte, 1884)
 Elytroleptus dichromaticus Linsley, 1961
 Elytroleptus divisus (LeConte, 1884)
 Elytroleptus floridanus (LeConte, 1862)
 Elytroleptus grandis Linsley, 1935
 Elytroleptus humeralis Linsley, 1961
 Elytroleptus ignitus (LeConte, 1884)
 Elytroleptus immaculipennis Knull, 1935
 Elytroleptus limpianus Skiles & Chemsak, 1982
 Elytroleptus luteicollis Skiles & Chemsak, 1982
 Elytroleptus luteus Dugès, 1879
 Elytroleptus metallicus (Nonfried, 1894)
 Elytroleptus nigripennis Bates, 1885
 Elytroleptus pallidus (Thomson, 1860)
 Elytroleptus peninsularis Hovore, 1988
 Elytroleptus rufipennis (LeConte, 1884)
 Elytroleptus scabricollis Bates, 1892
 Elytroleptus similis Chemsak & Linsley, 1965

References

 
Trachyderini
Cerambycidae genera